Excavator is a 2017 South Korean drama film written by Kim Ki-duk and directed by Lee Ju-hyoung.

Plot
Kim Gang-il, a paratrooper who was mobilized to suppress the demonstrations during the May 18th Gwangju Democratization Movement, is working as en excavator driver after his retirement. Subsequently, he uncovers findings that will reveal the inconvenient truth from twenty years prior.

Cast
Uhm Tae-woong as Kim Gang-il
Kim Kyung-ik as Farmer sibling
Shim Jung-wan as Coast sibling
Jung Se-hyung as Teller sibling/Airborne unit member 4 
Jo Duk-je as Staff sergeant Jang
Jo Yeong-jin as First sergeant
Park Se-joon as Platoon leader
Kim Jung-pal as Company commander
Jo Won-hee as Battalion commander
Sin Chang-soo as Division commander 
Son Byong-ho as Member of National Assembly
Son Jin-hwan as Brigade commander
Sin Hee-moon as Police constable Oh
Han In-gyoo as Kim Sang-kyeong
Jeong In-tae as Soldier on a leave
Park Jeong-geun as Soldier's friend
 Ryu Sung-rok as Student demonstrator

References

External links

2017 films
South Korean drama films
2017 drama films
2010s South Korean films